The Sopwith Wallaby was a British single-engined long-range biplane built during 1919 by Sopwith Aviation Company at Kingston upon Thames.

Development
The Wallaby was designed to compete in an Australian government £10,000 prize for an England to Australia flight. It was a single-engined biplane powered by a Rolls-Royce Eagle VIII engine. It had an open cockpit with two seats that could be retracted inside the enclosed cabin.

Operational history
The Wallaby registered G-EAKS departed Hounslow on 21 October 1919 for Australia. On 17 April 1920 it crashed on the island of Bali in the Dutch East Indies. It was shipped to Australia and re-built as an 8-seater transport and was used by Australian Aerial Services.

Operator

Australian Aerial Services

Specifications

See also

References

.

External links

 Contemporary technical description, with photographs and drawings, of the airplane and the planned flight from England to Australia.

1910s British airliners
Wallaby
Single-engined tractor aircraft
Biplanes
Aircraft first flown in 1919